The Profit may refer to:

 The Profit (film)
 The Profit (TV series)

See also
 Profit (disambiguation)
 Prophet (disambiguation)